

Æthelsige was a medieval Bishop of Sherborne.

Æthelsige was consecrated between 1011 and 1012. He died sometime after 1014.

Citations

References

External links
 

Bishops of Sherborne (ancient)
11th-century English Roman Catholic bishops